WJFP (740 kHz) is a commercial AM radio station broadcasting a conservative talk format. It is licensed to Chester, Pennsylvania, and serves the Philadelphia metropolitan area. The station is owned by John Fredericks, with the license held by Disruptor Radio, LLC. Fredericks hosts a syndicated weekday morning talk show and also owns three stations in Virginia. Other syndicated shows on WJFP include "The War Room with Steve Bannon," Dan Bongino, "The Ramsey Show with Dave Ramsey" and "Red Eye Radio."

By day, WJFP is powered at 1,000 watts. But 740 AM is a clear channel frequency reserved for Class A CFZM Toronto. So to avoid interference, at night WJFP greatly reduces power to 6 watts. It uses a non-directional antenna at all times. The transmitter is off Dutton Mill Road in Brookhaven, Pennsylvania. Programming is also heard on two FM translators: 95.3 W237EH in Pennsauken, New Jersey and 103.3 W277DL in Chester.

History
On , the station first signed on the air. The call sign from its founding until early 2022 was WVCH, standing for the "Voice of Chester". It was originally a daytimer, powered at 250 watts and required to sign off at night. It later boosted its power to 1,000 watts and got nighttime authorization at low power.

For most of its history, WVCH carried a Christian talk and teaching format branded as simply "WVCH, The Christian Station." One of the programs carried on WVCH in the 1950s was George A. Palmer's popular Morning Cheer weekday broadcast.

On November 15, 2021, RadioInsight.com reported that WVCH and translator W277DL would be sold to John Fredricks of the MAGA Radio Network through Disruptor Media, LLC, for $500,000. On February 16, 2022, the station flipped to a conservative talk format as "Liberty Radio". The sale was consummated on March 1, 2022, with the station's call sign changing to WJFP the following day.

References

External links

JFP
Radio stations established in 1948
1948 establishments in Pennsylvania
Conservative talk radio
Talk radio stations in the United States